Yaumbayevo (Yawımbay) is a rural locality (a village) in Baynazarovsky Selsoviet, Burzyansky District, Bashkortostan, Russia. The population was 436 as of 2010. There are 8 streets.

Geography 
Yaumbayevo is located 35 km northeast of Starosubkhangulovo (the district's administrative centre) by road. Baynazarovo is the nearest rural locality.

References 

Rural localities in Burzyansky District